In early July 2005, Hurricane Dennis brushed the southern coast of Haiti and produced deadly flash flooding across the nation. Forming from a tropical depression on July 4, Dennis began impacting Haiti two days later with heavy rains. Civil authorities and international agencies acted quickly to protect lives, ordering evacuations—approximately 1,000 people complied—and prepositioning emergency supplies. Over the subsequent two days, the hurricane's outer bands continued to impact the nation before effects abated. Widespread flash floods and landslides caused substantial damage, with areas along the Tiburon Peninsula taking the brunt of the impact. A bridge collapse near Grand-Goâve left 15 people dead or missing.

All told, Dennis killed 56 people and wrought US$50 million in damage. The nation's government released emergency relief funds on July 7 and international agencies provided considerable assistance to residents in the months after the storm. World Concern aided roughly 18,000 residents and the International Federation of Red Cross and Red Crescent Societies assisted approximately 4,000 people.

Background and preparations

On July 4, 2005, the National Hurricane Center classified a tropical depression near the Windward Islands. This system moved briskly to the west-northwest, becoming Tropical Storm Dennis the following day. Taking advantage of highly favorable environmental factors, such as low wind shear and high sea surface temperatures, Dennis rapidly intensified. By July 6, the system reached hurricane strength as it began traversing the Jamaica Channel. Around 12:00 UTC on July 7, the hurricane passed 85 mi (140 km) southwest of Les Cayes with maximum sustained winds of 105 mph (160 km/h)—a Category 2 on the Saffir–Simpson hurricane wind scale. The system subsequently struck Cuba as a Category 4 twice before moving over the Gulf of Mexico. It ultimately moved inland over Florida as a Category 3 on July 10 and dissipated over the Great Lakes eight days later.

Within hours of Dennis becoming a tropical storm on July 5, the Government of Haiti issued a tropical storm watch for areas between Port-au-Prince and the Haiti–Dominican Republic border. This was soon replaced by a hurricane watch and tropical storm warning spanning the entirety of the nation's Tiburon Peninsula. Owing to the cyclone's proximity, this was further increased to a hurricane warning on July 6. Advisories were discontinued early on July 8 as Dennis traversed Cuba and no longer posed an immediate threat to Haiti.

At least 300 people were relocated from Jérémie. Furthermore, small seagoing craft were urged to remain at port. Local media noted that the nation was particularly vulnerable to disasters with numerous homeless people inhabiting slums around Port-au-Prince in the wake of catastrophic flooding from Hurricane Jeanne in September 2004. At the time of Dennis's arrival, approximately 550,000 people were receiving assistance from the World Food Programme. The Haitian National Red Cross Society mobilized 300 personnel and identified ten potential shelters in the threatened region. At least 700 people utilized these shelters in Les Cayes, Port-Salut, and the Grand'Anse. The Pan American Disaster Response Unit branch of the International Federation of Red Cross And Red Crescent Societies (IFRC) was equipped with supplies for 10,000 people and prepared to deploy.

Impact
The outer bands of Hurricane Dennis began impacting Haiti on July 6, flooding multiple roadways. Although no official observations were relayed to the NHC, sustained tropical storm-force winds are believed to have affected much of the Tiburon Peninsula on July 7. Local media relayed reports of winds exceeding  in Jacmel, Jérémie, and Les Cayes on that day. Widespread damage was incurred across Sud department.

In Les Cayes, rivers over-topped their banks, high winds felled trees, 34 homes were damaged or destroyed, and the local hospital sustained significant damage. One person was killed and two others were injured when a tree destroyed a home. Flooding across the Ouest department submerged multiple districts, particularly around Petit-Goâve. Several search and rescue missions took place in the commune. In nearby Grand-Goâve, a bridge collapsed after numerous people gathered atop it to view flood waters. At least nine people died as a result with six others reported missing. At least 25 homes were destroyed in the commune. Damage was reported on Gonâve Island, with multiple homes collapsing. Throughout Grand'Anse, roughly 1,500 families were rendered homeless, 675 of which required urgent aid. During the storm, commune of Beaumont was isolated by landslides.

Approximately 15,000 people were directly affected by the hurricane. Widespread agricultural losses took place, with hundreds of livestock killed. World Concern director Kelly Miller reported the agricultural effects as "staggering". The storm wrecked 929 homes and damaged 3,058 others. All told, 56 people were killed, 36 sustained injury, and a further 24 were listed missing; damage across the nation reached $50 million.

Aftermath
With flash floods ensuing across much of southern Haiti on July 7, the Civil Protection Department released 2 million gourdes (US$48,800) in emergency funds. This was later increased in 5 million gourdes (US$120,500). Médecins Sans Frontières, the United Nations Stabilization Mission in Haiti, the World Food Programme, and other international agencies mobilized for relief efforts on this day. The IFRC provided immediate funds of 250,000 Swiss francs (US$192,000). By July 15, the nation's government requested international assistance to handle the aftermath of Hurricane Dennis. Japan was the first nation to comply, providing emergency supplies—such as blankets, generators, and radios—worth ¥11 million (US$97,900). This coincided with a disaster declaration by U.S. chargé d'affaires Douglas Griffiths, which also prompted release of US$50,000 in funds from the United States Agency for International Development. World Concern provided aid to 18,000 people, distributing emergency kits with food and basic supplies.

On July 15, the Inter-American Development Bank announced a US$5 million program to establish an early-warning system for floods across Haiti. In conjunction with funds to alleviate strain from a drought preceding Dennis, the European Commission provided Haiti with €400,000 (US$477,000).

Hurricane Emily brought further death and damage to the nation on July 17, though the effects were limited in comparison to Dennis. The IFRC's relief operation began on August 5, with a focus on distribution of hygiene and sanitation items. Approximately 4,000 people affected by Dennis and a further 1,000 by Emily were targeted in their program. Inclusive of funds allocated for Jamaica, the operation cost 758,000 Swiss francs (US$587,505).

See also

 Effects of Hurricane Georges in Haiti
 Hurricane Jeanne – a tropical cyclone in 2004 that produced catastrophic flash floods which killed more than 3,000 people in Haiti
 May 2004 Caribbean floods – approximately 2,000 peopled died in Haiti

References

External links
 The National Hurricane Center's advisory archive for Hurricane Dennis
  for Hurricane Dennis

Haiti
Dennis
Dennis
Dennis Haiti